Chydeniusbreen  is a glacier in Ny-Friesland at Spitsbergen, Svalbard. It is named after Finnish physicist Jakob Karl Emil Chydenius. The glacier has a length of about twentyfive kilometers, and flows from the mountain group of Chydeniusfjella towards the bay of Vaigattbogen.

References

Glaciers of Spitsbergen